The epiphyseal plate (or epiphysial plate, physis, or growth plate)  is a hyaline cartilage plate in the metaphysis at each end of a long bone. It is the part of a long bone where new bone growth takes place; that is, the whole bone is alive, with maintenance remodeling throughout its existing bone tissue, but the growth plate is the place where the long bone grows longer (adds length).

The plate is only found in children and adolescents;  in adults, who have stopped growing, the plate is replaced by an epiphyseal line. This replacement is known as epiphyseal closure or growth plate fusion. Complete fusion can occur as early as 12 for girls (with the most common being 14-15 years for girls) and as early as 14 for boys (with the most common being 15–17 years for boys).

Structure

Development
Endochondral ossification is responsible for the initial bone development from cartilage in utero and infants and the longitudinal growth of long bones in the epiphyseal plate. The plate's chondrocytes are under constant division by mitosis. These daughter cells stack facing the epiphysis while the older cells are pushed towards the diaphysis. As the older chondrocytes degenerate, osteoblasts ossify the remains to form new bone. In puberty increasing levels of estrogen, in both females and males, leads to increased apoptosis of chondrocytes in the epiphyseal plate. Depletion of chondrocytes due to apoptosis leads to less ossification and growth slows down and later stops when the entire cartilage have become replaced by bone, leaving only a thin epiphyseal scar which later disappears.

Histology
The growth plate has a very specific morphology in having a zonal arrangement as follows:

Clinical significance
Defects in the development and continued division of epiphyseal plates can lead to growth disorders collectively known as osteochondrodysplasia. The most common defect is achondroplasia, where there is a defect in cartilage formation. Achondroplasia is the most common cause of dwarfism or short stature and it also manifests in generalized deformities of bones and joints. However, various other types of osteochondrodysplasias can cause short stature and generalized deformities of bones and joints due to abnormal function of growth plate cartilage cells. Hereditary multiple exostoses is a genetic condition that is caused by growth irregularities of the epiphyseal plates of the long bones of the upper and lower limbs. It usually results in limb deformities and a certain degree of functional limitations.

Salter–Harris fractures are fractures involving epiphyseal plates and hence tend to interfere with growth, height or physiologic functions.

Osgood-Schlatter disease results from stress on the epiphyseal plate in the tibia, leading to excess bone growth and a painful lump at the knee.

There are important clinical implications of the growth plate physiology. For example guided growth surgery, also known as temporary hemiepiphysiodesis is used to achieve correction or straightening of the bone deformities in a variety of pediatric orthopedic disorders such as Blount's disease, rickets, arthrogryposis multiplex congenita and osteochondrodysplasias among others. This applies to bone and joint deformities in the coronal – medial/lateral – plane or genu varum/genu valgum plane and in the sagittal – anterior/posterior – plane or knee flexion deformity/genu recurvatum plane.

Other animals
John Hunter studied growing chickens. He observed bones grew at the ends and thus demonstrated the existence of the epiphyseal plates. Hunter is considered the "father of the growth plate."

See also
 Human development (biology)
 Salter–Harris fracture

References

External links
Normal bones at GetTheDiagnosis.org, showing the development of epiphyseal plates for different ages and bones.

Skeletal system
Medical mnemonics